Aquinas Old Collegians Football Club, nicknamed the Bloods, is an amateur Australian rules football club in Ringwood, Victoria, playing in the Victorian Amateur Football Association (VAFA). Previously called Aquinas Old Boys Football Club when it was founded in 1981, the club plays at Aquinas College. The club song is "We're a team of Champions", to the tune of "Join in the Chorus" .

The Bloods won the 1987 and 1996 Grand Finals and have played D1 football.

Aquinas won the Senior and Reserve D4 Premierships in 2017 and will be competing in D3 in 2018.

References

Victorian Amateur Football Association clubs
Australian rules football clubs in Melbourne
Australian rules football clubs established in 1981
1981 establishments in Australia
Sport in the City of Maroondah